Honoré-Gaspard de Coriolis (1735–1824) was a French Roman Catholic cleric and historian.

Biography

Early life
Honoré-Gaspard de Coriolis was born in 1735 in Aix-en-Provence.

Career
He served as a clerical advisor to the Parliament of Aix-en-Provence.

A Jesuit, he served as vicar general of the Roman Catholic Diocese of Mende. Later, he served as a canon in Notre Dame de Paris, the Roman Catholic cathedral in Paris.

In his writings, he explained that Provence during the Ancien Régime was linked to the Kingdom of France without being its subaltern.

Death
He died on 14 May 1824 in Paris. His nephew was Gaspard-Gustave Coriolis (1792-1843).

Bibliography
Traité sur l'administration du comté de Provence (Aix-en-Provence: Imprimerie de Vve A. Adibert, 1786-1788, 3 volumes).
Dissertation sur les états de Provence (Aix-en-Provence: Remondet-Aubin, 1867).

References

1735 births
1824 deaths
People from Aix-en-Provence
18th-century French lawyers
French Jesuits
Provencal nobility